Baloghonthobium is a genus of Scarabaeidae or scarab beetles in the superfamily Scarabaeoidea.

The genus consists of one species found in New Caledonia

References

Scarabaeidae